Hambone and Hillie is a 1984 American comedy-drama film about a dog (Hambone) separated from his owner (Hillie). The dog treks from New York to Los Angeles, meeting a host of helpers along the way. It was directed by Roy Watts, and starred Lillian Gish, Timothy Bottoms, Candy Clark, and O. J. Simpson.

Plot
A dog treks a long, arduous journey from New York City to Los Angeles to be reunited with his owner, Hillie (Lillian Gish), meeting a lot of helpers along the way.

Cast
 Lillian Gish as Hillie Radcliffe
 Candy Clark as Nancy Rollins
 O. J. Simpson as Tucker
 Robert Walker Jr. as The Wanderer
 Jack Carter as Lester Burns
 Alan Hale Jr.  as McVickers
 Anne Lockhart as Roberta Radcliffe
 Timothy Bottoms as Michael Radcliffe
 Sidney Robin Greenbush as Amy McVickers
 William Jordan as Bert Rollins
 Paul Koslo as Jere
 Arnie Moore as Dognapper
 Nancy Morgan as Ellen
 Robert Feero as Skip
 Alan Abelew as Manny
 Maureen Quinn as Edna Reilly
 Vincent Doherty as Baggage Handler
 Hap Lawrence as L.A. TWA Clerk
 Marc Bentley as Danny
 Nicole Eggert as Marci
 Virginya Keehne as Shelly
 Gregory Brown as Pat
 Bill Berry as Chicago Sheriff
 Jennifer George as Kathy Radcliffe
 Wil Wheaton as Jeff Radcliffe
 Lillian Adams as Estelle
 David Wiley as Dr. Simpkins
 Tom Preston as Highway Patrol Officer
 Robert Michaels as Mover
 Hambone as Hambone
 Patches as Camille
 Mike as Scrapper
 Ellie as Barney

Production

Filming
Hambone and Hillie was filmed in the summer of 1983 in Pittsburgh, Pennsylvania.

Casting
Lillian Gish was cast as Hillie Radcliffe.

Release
Hambone and Hillie was released in theatres on April 24, 1984. The film was released on VHS on October 6, 1997, by Anchor Bay Entertainment.

References

Citations

Sources

External links

Hambone and Hillie at TCMDB

1980s English-language films
1980s American films
1984 films
1984 comedy-drama films
American comedy-drama films
Fictional duos
New World Pictures films